Charlotte Grove (1773–1860) was an English diarist.

Biography
She was the first child and eldest daughter of Thomas Grove, a landowner of Ferne House, Donhead St Andrew, Wiltshire, by his marriage to Charlotte Pilfold. Her sister Harriet Grove became known as the "first love" of the poet Percy Bysshe Shelley.

In 1827, at the age of 44, she married the new rector of Berwick St John, Richard Downes.

Charlotte kept a diary from 1811 until her death, although some years have not survived. The surviving original diaries are held at the Wiltshire and Swindon History Centre in Chippenham. Edited diary entries are included in The Grove Diaries, which also features the diaries of three other members of the Grove family including her sister Harriet (years 1809–1810) and much later, Agnes Geraldine Grove, daughter of Augustus Henry Lane-Fox Pitt Rivers and a friend of Thomas Hardy. Two volumes of transcriptions of the diaries were published in 2007 and 2013.

References

1773 births
1860 deaths
People from Wiltshire
English diarists
Women diarists
19th-century British women writers
19th-century British writers